Lucy Kroll (3 July 1909 – 14 March 1997) was an American theatrical and literary agent.  Her clients included Carl Sandburg, James Earl Jones, Norman Mailer, John Vlahos, and Horton Foote. Born in Brooklyn, her maiden name was Lucy Rosengardt.  She graduated from Hunter College in 1933.

References

External links
Finding aid to the Lucy Kroll Papers at the Library of Congress: http://findingaids.loc.gov/db/search/xq/searchMfer02.xq?_id=loc.mss.eadmss.ms006016

1909 births
1997 deaths
Hunter College alumni
People from Brooklyn
Literary agents